Haraguchi Kento (原口健飛, born 9 April 1998) is a Japanese kickboxer. He is the former RISE Lightweight champion, having held the title in 2020, and the 2020 Dead or Alive Lightweight tournament winner.

Haraguchi began his career competing in karate and amateur kickboxing, before transitioning to professional boxing in 2015, at the age of 17. Two years later, he returned to kickboxing and made his professional debut in 2017.

As of May 2021, Combat Press ranks him as the #3 super bantamweight kickboxer in the world. Combat Press has ranked him in the Super Bantamweight top ten since November 2020.

Personal life
Haraguchi married at the age of 19. He is a father of two daughters. His first daughter, Noa, was born when he was 17 and a second-year in high school.

Kickboxing career

ACCEL

ACCEL Featherweight title reign
Haraguchi made his professional debut against Shiro Kajihara at All Boxing World 10th. He won the fight by a third round technical knockout. His debut win, as well as his boxing and karate career, earned Haraguchi the chance to fight Fumihiro Uesugi at ACCEL vol.37, in Uesugi's fifth title defense. During the first round of their bout, Uesugi looked to push into the pocket behind a high guard, however, Haraguchi kept distance with a front kick and racked up damage with body kicks. Near the end of the first round, Haraguchi staggered his opponent with a left hook and knocked him down through a combination of punches. Haraguchi immediately pressured as the second round began, thoroughly dominating the champion and forcing him to take a knee three times, which awarded Hariguchi the technical knockdown.

Haraguchi participated in the RISE Dead or Alive 57 kg tournament, held at RISE 121. He was scheduled to fight Taiki Naito in the quarterfinals. The fight was ruled a draw after the first three rounds, which resulted in an extra fourth round being fought. Naito won the extra round by unanimous decision.

Haraguchi was scheduled to make his first title defense against Shogo Kuriaki at ACCEL vol.38. Although the fight was close, Haraguchi won the fight by unanimous decision, with all the judges awarding him all three rounds. 

He returned to RISE at RISE 132, when he was scheduled to fight the #6 ranked RISE Super Featherweight Jun Aiolos. Haraguchi dominated the bout, knocking Aiolos down twice in the first round and twice in the second round, before Aiolos' corner threw in the towel. Haraguchi was scheduled to fight Henry Cejas in a non-title bout at ACCEL vol.39. Haraguchi fought mainly off the back-foot, slowly accumulating damage on his opponent, before knocking Cejas out with a jumping switch kick at the very end of the third round.

Road to RIZIN
Haraguchi was scheduled to participate in the Road to RIZIN Tournament, held during RISE 125. He was scheduled to fight the WBC Muaythai International Featherweight champion Momotaro in the semifinals, with the other semifinal bout being contested by Shuto Miyazaki and Yamato Fujita. Haraguchi beat Momotaro by a closely contested unanimous decision, with all three judges awarding him a single round, while scoring the other two rounds as draws. He was more dominant in the final bout against Shuto Miyazaki, winning once again by unanimous decision (30-26, 30-28 and 30-27). Winning the tournament earned him the opportunity to fight at the next RIZIN event.

Haraguchi was scheduled to make his second title defense against Chibita at ACCEL vol.40. Early on in the first round, Haraguchi landed a body kick which broke Chibita's ribs, while a second kick to the body resulted in the first knockdown of the fight. Haraguchi kept kicking Chibita's body which resulted in a knockout 90 seconds into the fight.

Haraguchi made his RIZIN debut at RIZIN 13, when he was scheduled to fight the former K-1 Super Featherweight champion Taiga Kawabe. The closely contested fight was ruled a majority draw, with one of the three judges awarding Haraguchi a 30-29 scorecard.

RISE
Haraguchi was scheduled to fight the ISKA Spain K-1 and Muay Thai champion Miguel Martinez during the opening round of the 2019 RISE World Series. The fight ended after just 25 seconds, as Haraguchi knocked Martinez out with a body kick.

Haraguchi was next scheduled to fight against the #2 ranked RISE lightweight Tomohiro Kitai at RISE 132. Haraguchi made use of his superior speed and outfighting ability to win by unanimous decision, winning all three rounds on the judges scorecards.

In the semifinal event of the RISE World Series, Haraguchi faced Lu Jun. Jun came into the fight 0.8 kg over the weight limit. He was given a one point deduction and heavier gloves as a penalty for the weight miss. Haraguchi managed to stagger Jun with a head kick at the very beginning of the match, before knocking him out after only 67 seconds of the first round.

At Rise World Series 2019 Final Round, Haraguchi was scheduled to fight the 2017 RISE Super Featherweight champion Chan Hyung Lee. Haraguchi was dominant throughout the fight, winning the fight by unanimous decision. Two of the judges awarded him 30-27 on their scorecards, with the last one awarding him a 30-28 scorecard.

On September 1, 2019, Haraguchi was scheduled to fight the former KNOCK OUT Lightweight champion Yosuke Morii at JAPAN KICKBOXING INNOVATION, in a five round fight with elbows allowed. Haraguchi looked to push the pace, pressuring Morii with kicks, with Morii looking to relive the pressure through clinch work. Haraguchi scored the first knockdown in the second round with a right hook. Less than 30 seconds into the third round, Haraguchi once again scored a knockdown with a right hook. Although Morii was able to beat the eight count, the referee nonetheless decided the wave the fight off.

RISE Lightweight champion

Title reign
Haraguchi was scheduled to fight the #1 ranked RISE Lightweight, and one-time title challenger, Hideki at RISE 136 for the vacant RISE Lightweight championship. Haraguchi came into the fight as the #2 ranked RISE lightweight, on a five-fight winning streak. The fight began with both fighters fighting out of the southpaw stance, trading low leg kicks. The fight ended in the last minute of the first round, as Haraguchi knocked his opponent down with a lead right hook counter to Hideki's left straight. Hideki was unable to beat the eight-count, resulting in a knockout victory for Haraguchi. During his post-fight speech, Haraguchi called out the previous RISE Lightweight champion Taiju Shiratori.

Haraguchi was scheduled to fight Chadd Collins in the semifinals of the 2020 RISE World Series tournament. The other two semifinalists were Nuenglanlek Jitmuangnon and Taiju Shiratori.
The RISE World Series tournament was later scrapped, as Collins and Nuenglanlek were unable to enter the country at the time, due to travel restrictions imposed in order to slow the spread of COVID-19. Haraguchi was instead scheduled to fight Vitor Tofanelli at Rise on Abema, in a 67kg bout, 4 kilograms above Haraguchi's usual weight. Haraguchi won the fight by unanimous decision, utilizing outfighting to score on the advancing Tofanelli.

Haraguchi was scheduled to fight a rematch with Taiga Kawabe at Rizin 23 – Yokohama. Their first match at Rizin 13 was ruled a draw. Since their first fight, Haraguchi had won all seven of his fights, while Taiga entered the fight with only a single win in past seven fights. Haraguchi dominated the entirety of the bout, knocking Taiga down three times in less than three minutes, winning the fight by a technical knockout.

RISE Dead or Alive Tournament
His position as the RISE Lightweight champion earned Haraguchi a place in the 2020 RISE Dead of Alive 63 kg tournament, being scheduled to fight the 2018 SHOOT BOXING Japan Lightweight Champion Renta Nishioka in the semifinals. The two other participants in the tournament were Naoki Tanaka and Taiju Shiratori, with Haraguchi and Shiratori being the favorites to enter the tournament final.

In the semifinals bout, Haraguchi beat Renta Nishioka through a dominant unanimous decision, justifying his role as the favorite. Haraguchi then faced Naoki Tanaka in the finals. He immediately pressured Tanaka backwards with a combination of body-head punches and managed to knock Tanaka down, after successfully pushing his opponent into the ring corner. Although Tanaka managed to beat the eight-count, the referee decided to wave the fight off due to Tanaka being unsteady on his feet. Haraguchi was awarded ¥5,000,000 for winning the tournament, as well as a ¥500,000 knockout bonus.

During the post-fight interview, Haraguchi reiterated his desire to fight Taiju Shiratori, with RISE president Takashi Ito likewise stating that the Haraguchi-Shiratori bout was in their 2021 plans.

Move to super lightweight

Haraguchi vs. Shiratori
On December 15, 2020, Haraguchi vacated the RISE Lightweight title, stating that he wanted to focus on a planned RISE Dead or Alive tournament. Haraguchi was expected to face the Glory featherweight champion Petpanomrung Kiatmuu9 at RISE El Dorado in February 2021.  Petpanomrung was unable to enter Japan, as the travel restrictions imposed to combat the COVID-19 pandemic were extended from February 7th to March 7th. He was accordingly replaced by the 2019 RISE Lightweight Champion Taiju Shiratori, 24 days before the event. The two of them were previously scheduled to participate in the RISE WORLD SERIES 2020 -63kg Tournament, which was to be held in spring of 2020, but was cancelled due to the emerging COVID-19 pandemic. They were also expected to fight in the final of the DEAD OR ALIVE 2020 -63kg class tournament held on October 11, 2020, as they were both favorites in their semifinal bouts. However, Shiratori unexpectedly lost to Naoki Tanaka.

During the first round of the fight against Shiratori, Haraguchi focused on landing the right straight and body kicks on his southpaw opponent. During the second round, Haraguchi managed to knock Shiratori down twice. The first knockdown came after Haraguchi switched to southpaw and landed a partial spinning hook kick to the head of Shiratori. The second knockdown came as both fighters were turning to face each-other and Haraguchi landed a head kick from the orthodox stance. Haraguchi continued to pressure in the third round, but was unable to finish Shiratori, winning the fight by unanimous decision. During the post-fight conference, RISE representative Takashi Ito stated that the Petpanomrung Kiatmuu9 fight was still in the organization's plans.

Haraguchi vs. Tapruwan
Haraguchi was scheduled to face the former WMC World featherweight and RISE Super Lightweight champion Tapruwan Hadesworkout at RISE WORLD SERIES 2021 Yokohama on September 23, 2021. The bout was contested at a 65.5kg catch-weight, 2.5kg above Haraguchi's usual weight. Although RISE had other opponents in mind for Haraguchi, restrictions imposed due to the COVID-19 pandemic forced them to rely on competitors currently present in Japan. Haraguchi won the fight by a third-round technical knockout. After an even first-round, Tapruwan managed to knock Haraguchi down with a knee strike in the second round. Haraguchi rallied in the third round and knocked Tapruwan down with a left hook. Although his opponent was able to beat the eight-count, Haraguchi soon after unloaded with a barrage of punches, which forced the referee to stop the fight.

Haraguchi vs. Petpanomrung
On October 22, 2021, it was revealed by that Haraguchi would face the four-time defending Glory Featherweight Champion Petpanomrung Kiatmuu9 at RISE World Series 2021 Osaka 2 on November 14, 2021. The pair was originally scheduled to face each other at RISE El Dorado on February 28, 2021, before the fight was eventually postponed due to the COVID-19 pandemic. Haraguchi lost the fight by unanimous decision, with two judges awarding Petpanomrung a 30-28 scorecard, and the third judge scoring the fight 30-29 for him. Haraguchi was unable to mount any consistent offense against the Thai, who in turn successfully landed a great volume of knees and kicks, although he was given a yellow card for illegal clinching in the second round.

Haraguchi vs. Lompetch, Yamazaki
At a press conference held by RISE on February 18, 2022, it was announced that Haraguchi would next face the ISKA Muay thai world super lightweight champion Lompetch Y'zdgym. The fight was scheduled for RISE El Dorado 2022, which took place on April 2, 2022. He won the fight by first round technical knockout, scoring three knockdowns in one round.

Haraguchi faced the K-1 World GP 2016 -65kg Japan Tournament winner and one-time K-1 Super Lightweight champion Hideaki Yamazaki on June 19, 2022, on the undercard of The Match 2022. The event was broadcast by Abema TV as a pay per view. Haraguchi won the fight by a second-round technical knockout. He knocked Yamazaki down twice in the opening round, first time with a flurry of punches with under a minute left in the round and the second time with a straight. Following a second knockdown in the next round, the referee opted to step in and stop the fight. It was later revealed that Haraguchi had broken Yamazaki's jaw, who was forced to undergo surgery as a result.

Haraguchi vs. Petpanomrung II
Haraguchi was booked to face the Glory Featherweight champion Petpanomrung Kiatmuu9 for the inaugural RISE World Super Lightweight title in the main event of RISE WORLD SERIES OSAKA 2022 on August 21, 2022. The bout would be a rematch of their November 14, 2021 meeting, which Petpanomrung won by unanimous decision. The fight was ruled a split decision draw after the first five rounds, with all three judges turning in different scorecards. Judge Miyamoto scored the fight 50–49 for Haraguchi, judge Nagase scored it 49–48 for Petpanomrung, while judge Wada had it as an even 49–49 draw. Accordingly, an extra round was fought, after which Petpanomrung won a unanimous decision. Haraguchi was dissatisfied with the decision and claimed he would request a review of the judges' decision in his post-fight interview. RISE CEO Takashi Ito confirmed that the review will be held, should Haraguchi request it. Haraguchi withdrew his post-fight comments the next day, although he still expressed his concern with how the fights were refereed.

Haraguchi vs. Adamchuk
On October 15, 2022, it was revealed that Haraguchi would face the Shootboxing and Glory veteran Zakaria Zouggary at RISE WORLD SERIES / Glory Rivals 4 on December 25, 2022, in what was his third consecutive appearance at a RISE and Glory cross-promotional event and his third fight at the super lightweight (-65 kg) limit. On November 24, it was announced that Zouggary had withdrawn from the fight with an undisclosed injury and would be replaced by the former Glory Featherweight champion Serhiy Adamchuk. He won the fight by unanimous decision, with one scorecard of 30–28 and two scorecards of 30–27.

Haraguchi vs. Monteiro
Haraguchi faced Jérémy Monteiro for the vacant ISKA Light Welterweight (-65 kg) K-1 Rules World title at RISE ELDORADO 2023 on March 26, 2023. Monteiro held the Light Welterweight Oriental Rules title at the time and had previously unsuccessfully challenged for the muay thai rules championship as well.

Championships and accomplishments

Titles
Professional
ACCEL
 2017 ACCEL Featherweight Championship
RISE
 2019 RISE Lightweight Championship
 2020 RISE Dead or Alive -63kg Tournament Winner

Amateur
Shin Karate
2008 Shin Karate K-4 Gaora Cup Elementary School Third Place
2009 Shin Karate K-4 Gaora Cup Elementary School Champion
2010 Shin Karate West Japan K-4 Tournament Elementary School Champion
2011 Shin Karate K-3 Gaora Cup Middle School Champion
2017 Amateur Dageki Kakutougi Japan Cup -57.5kg Champion
All Japan Glove Karate Federation
2010 All Japan Glove Karate Federation Elementary School Third Place
2011 All Japan Glove Karate Federation Middle School Lightweight Champion
2012 All Japan Glove Karate Federation Middle School Lightweight Champion & Event MVP
Point & K.O. Karate Association
2014 All Japan Karate Point & KO Rules Middle School Lightweight Winner

Awards
eFight.jp
2x eFight Fighter of the Month (January 2020, March 2021)

Kickboxing record

|-  style="text-align:center; background:#"
| 2023-03-26 || ||align=left| Jérémy Monteiro|| RISE ELDORADO 2023 || Tokyo, Japan ||  || ||
|-
!  style=background:white colspan=9 |
|-  style="background:#cfc;"
| 2022-12-25|| Win ||align=left| Serhiy Adamchuk || RISE WORLD SERIES / Glory Rivals 4|| Tokyo, Japan || Decision (Unanimous) || 3 || 3:00
|-  style="background:#fbb;"
| 2022-08-21|| Loss ||align=left| Petpanomrung Kiatmuu9 || RISE WORLD SERIES OSAKA 2022 || Osaka, Japan || Ext.R Decision (Unanimous) || 6 || 3:00 
|-
!  style=background:white colspan=9 |
|-  style="text-align:center; background:#cfc"
| 2022-06-19 || Win ||align=left| Hideaki Yamazaki || THE MATCH 2022 || Tokyo, Japan || TKO (Ref. stoppage/punches) || 2 || 0:33
|-  style="text-align:center; background:#cfc"
| 2022-04-02 || Win||align=left| Lompetch Y'zdgym || RISE El Dorado 2022 || Tokyo, Japan || TKO (3 Knockdowns) ||  1||1:56
|-
|-  style="text-align:center; background:#fbb"
| 2021-11-14 || Loss || align=left| Petpanomrung Kiatmuu9 || RISE World Series 2021 Osaka 2 || Osaka, Japan || Decision (Unanimous) || 3 || 3:00 
|-  style="text-align:center; background:#cfc;"
| 2021-09-23|| Win ||align=left| Tapruwan Hadesworkout || RISE WORLD SERIES 2021 Yokohama || Yokohama, Japan || TKO (Punches) || 3 || 1:35
|-  style="text-align:center; background:#cfc;"
| 2021-02-28 || Win || align=left| Taiju Shiratori || RISE Eldorado 2021 || Yokohama, Japan ||  Decision (Unanimous) || 3 || 3:00
|-  style="text-align:center; background:#cfc;"
| 2020-10-11||Win||align=left| Naoki Tanaka || RISE DEAD OR ALIVE 2020 Yokohama, Final||  Yokohama, Japan || KO (Right Hook) || 1 || 2:54
|-
! style=background:white colspan=9 |
|-  style="text-align:center; background:#cfc;"
| 2020-10-11||Win ||align=left| Renta Nishioka || RISE DEAD OR ALIVE 2020 Yokohama, Semi Final||  Yokohama, Japan || Decision (Unanimous)|| 3 || 3:00
|-  style="text-align:center; background:#cfc;"
| 2020-08-10 || Win ||align=left| Taiga|| Rizin 23 – Yokohama || Yokohama, Japan || KO (Punches) || 1 || 2:50
|-  style="text-align:center; background:#cfc;"
| 2020-07-12|| Win ||align=left| Vitor Tofanelli || Rise on Abema || Tokyo, Japan || Decision (Unanimous) || 3 || 3:00
|-  style="text-align:center; background:#cfc;"
| 2020-01-13||Win ||align=left| Hideki || RISE 136 || Tokyo, Japan || KO (Right Hook) || 1 || 2:23 
|-
! style=background:white colspan=9 |
|- style="text-align:center; background:#cfc;"
| 2019-11-17|| Win || style="text-align:left;"| Yosuke Morii ||JAPAN KICKBOXING INNOVATION ||Okayama, Japan|| TKO (High Kick & Punches) || 3 || 0:34
|- style="text-align:center; background:#cfc;"
| 2019-09-16|| Win||align=left| Chan Hyung Lee || Rise World Series 2019 Final Round || Chiba (city), Japan || Decision (Unanimous)|| 3 || 3:00
|- style="text-align:center; background:#cfc;"
| 2019-07-21|| Win ||align=left| Lu Jun || Rise World Series 2019, Semi Final || Osaka, Japan || KO (Punches) || 1|| 1:05
|- style="text-align:center; background:#cfc;"
| 2019-05-19|| Win ||align=left| Tomohiro Kitai || RISE 132 || Tokyo, Japan || Decision (Unanimous) || 3|| 3:00
|- style="text-align:center; background:#cfc;"
| 2019-03-10|| Win ||align=left| Miguel Martinez || Rise World Series 2019, First Round || Tokyo, Japan || KO (Left Body Kick)|| 1 || 0:25
|-  style="text-align:center; background:#c5d2ea;"
| 2018-09-30|| Draw||align=left| Taiga || Rizin 13 - Saitama || Saitama, Japan || Decision || 3 || 3:00
|- style="text-align:center; background:#cfc;"
| 2018-07-28|| Win ||align=left| Chibita || ACCEL vol.40 || Kobe, Japan || KO (Left Middle Kick) || 1|| 1:30  
|-
! style=background:white colspan=9 |
|- style="text-align:center; background:#cfc;"
| 2018-06-16|| Win ||align=left| Shuto Miyazaki|| RISE 125, Road to RIZIN Tournament, Final || Chiba (city), Japan || Decision (Unanimous) || 3|| 3:00
|- style="text-align:center; background:#cfc;"
| 2018-06-16|| Win ||align=left| Momotaro || RISE 125, Road to RIZIN Tournament, Semi Final || Chiba (city), Japan || Decision (Unanimous) || 3|| 3:00
|- style="text-align:center; background:#cfc;"
| 2018-05-03|| Win ||align=left| Henry Cejas|| ACCEL vol.39 || Kobe, Japan || KO (Jumping Switch Kick) || 3|| 2:59
|- style="text-align:center; background:#cfc;"
| 2018-03-24|| Win ||align=left| Jun Aiolos || RISE 123 || Tokyo, Japan || TKO (Corner Stoppage) || 2|| 1:06
|- style="text-align:center; background:#cfc;"
| 2017-12-24|| Win ||align=left| Shogo Kuriaki || ACCEL vol.38 || Kobe, Japan || Decision (Unanimous) || 3|| 3:00  
|-
! style=background:white colspan=9 |
|- style="text-align:center; background:#fbb;"
| 2017-11-23|| Loss ||align=left| Taiki Naito|| RISE 121, DEAD or ALIVE -57kg Tournament, Quarter Final || Tokyo, Japan || Ext.R Decision (Unanimous) || 4|| 3:00
|- style="text-align:center; background:#cfc;"
| 2017-08-12|| Win ||align=left| Fumihiro Uesugi|| ACCEL vol.37 || Kobe, Japan || KO (3 Knockdowns) || 2|| 2:22  
|-
! style=background:white colspan=9 |
|- style="text-align:center; background:#cfc;"
| 2017-06-04|| Win ||align=left| Shiro Kajihara|| All Boxing World 10th || Osaka, Japan || TKO (Punches & Kicks) || 3||   
|-
| colspan=9 | Legend:    

|-  style="background:#cfc;"
| 2017-10-09|| Win ||align=left| Tokio Yachuda || Dageki Kakutougi Japan Cup, Final || Tokyo, Japan || KO (Punches)|| 1 ||
|-
! style=background:white colspan=9 |

|-  style="background:#cfc;"
| 2017-10-09|| Win ||align=left| Ren Sugiyama || Dageki Kakutougi Japan Cup, Semifinals || Tokyo, Japan || Decision ||  ||

|-
| colspan=9 | Legend:

Professional Boxing record

|-
|5
|Loss
|4–1
|style="text-align:left;"| Tatsuya Terada
|
|4 (4), 
|
|18 July 2016
|style="text-align:left;"| 
|style="text-align:left;"|
|-
|4
|Win
|4–0
|style="text-align:left;"| Akito Terada
|KO
|2 (4), 
|
|08 May 2016
|style="text-align:left;"| 
|style="text-align:left;"|
|-
|3
|Win
|3–0
|style="text-align:left;"| Kazuki Kimura
|
|4 (4), 
|
|27 December 2015
|style="text-align:left;"| 
|
|-
|2
|Win
|2–0
|style="text-align:left;"| Yuki Sueyoshi
|UD
|4 (4), 
|
|23 August 2015
|style="text-align:left;"| 
|
|-
|1
|Win
|1–0
|style="text-align:left;"| Kazuhiro Hirahara
|
|4 (4), 
|
|07 June 2015
|style="text-align:left;"| 
|
|-
| colspan=10 | Legend:

See also
 List of male kickboxers

References

Living people
1998 births
Japanese male kickboxers
People from Itami, Hyōgo
Sportspeople from Hyōgo Prefecture